Comitas recticosta is an extinct species of sea snail, a marine gastropod mollusc in the family Pseudomelatomidae.

Description

Distribution
Fossils of this species were found in Piedmont, Italy.

References

 Bellardi, L. "Monografia delle Pleurotome fossili del Piemonte. Mem. R." Acc. Sc. Torino s 2 (1847): 531-650

External links
  Pseudomelatomidae, Italian Society of Malacology

recticosta
Gastropods described in 1847